Pál Katkó (21 November 1938 – 18 April 2008) was a Hungarian sports shooter. He placed 20th in the 50 metre pistol event at the 1972 Summer Olympics.

References

External links
 

1938 births
2008 deaths
Hungarian male sport shooters
Olympic shooters of Hungary
Shooters at the 1972 Summer Olympics
People from Salgótarján
Sportspeople from Nógrád County